The statutes of the State of Ohio have established 26 departments of government which are responsible to the Governor. These departments are led by the Director, or in some cases the Commissioner, who must inform and assist the governor in the operation of the state. After the governor appoints the potential director, they must be affirmed by the Ohio Senate.

No limit nor imposition are placed upon the terms, except in the cases that they may be replaced by the current governor, or they resign their term. In turn, the directors may appoint their own staff.

Since the governor appoints the Directors, they are directly incorporated into the Executive branch of Ohio. This gives them the broad authority to enforce the laws of Ohio directly. Many of these Departments issue administrative opinions, proceedings, and decisions, which in turn have the legal influence of stare decisis.

Notices and proposed rules are published in the Register of Ohio, which are codified in the Ohio Administrative Code (OAC).

List of departments

There are several cabinet or administrative departments:

 Ohio National Guard
 Department of Administrative Services
 Department of Aging
 Department of Agriculture
 Office of Budget and Management 
 Department of Commerce
 Development Services Agency
 Department of Developmental Disabilities
 Department of Education
 Environmental Protection Agency
 Department of Health
 Office of the Inspector General
 Department of Insurance
 Department of Job and Family Services
 Department of Medicaid
 Department of Mental Health and Addiction Services
 Department of Natural Resources
 Department of Public Safety
 Public Utilities Commission
 Board of Regents
 Department of Rehabilitation and Correction
 Department of Taxation
 Department of Transportation
 Department of Veterans Services
 Bureau of Workers' Compensation
 Department of Youth Services

Members of the Cabinet are listed at List of members of the Ohio Cabinet

References

External links
Governor's Cabinet

United States state cabinets